Cyril Chakkunny Valloor is a former India men's national volleyball team player from Kerala. He represented the country in several competitions, including the 1986 Seoul Asian Games where he captained the Indian team that won the bronze medal. This was the best volleyball team sent by India to an Asian games. In the 1980s Indian volleyball was a force to reckon with when Jimmy George and Cyril Valloor played for the country.

In 1986, he was conferred the Arjuna Award for his contribution to the Indian volleyball. Cyril is an alumnus of Calicut University.

References

Indian men's volleyball players
Living people
Recipients of the Arjuna Award
Volleyball players from Kerala
Asian Games medalists in volleyball
Volleyball players at the 1986 Asian Games
Medalists at the 1986 Asian Games
Asian Games bronze medalists for India
1961 births